The Seven Sacraments refers to two series of paintings of the seven sacraments by the French painter Nicolas Poussin.

First series

Painted between 1637 and 1640, the first series was commissioned by Cassiano del Pozzo in the second half of the 1630s and was sold to the Dukes of Rutland in 1784. One of the seven, Penance, was destroyed in a fire at the Rutlands' Belvoir Castle in 1816, and Baptism was acquired by the National Gallery of Art in Washington DC in 1939, where it still resides. The remaining five were still at Belvoir Castle at the time when Anthony Blunt wrote his catalogue in 1966 and then were on show at the National Gallery in London until recently. All five of these paintings in the National Gallery were taken off show in November 2010 prior to the attempted sale of Ordination on 8 December that year.  Ordination was ultimately purchased by the Kimbell Art Museum for US$24.3 million and was displayed for the first time there on September 14, 2011. The Fitzwilliam Museum in Cambridge in 2013 bought Extreme Unction from the Duke of Rutland, who retains ownership of the remaining three works in the series.

The images listed below are the remaining six paintings of the first series:
Baptism (image)
Ordination (image)
Confirmation (image)
Penance (image)
Eucharist (image)
Marriage (image)
Extreme Unction (image)

Second series
The second series was painted for Paul Fréart de Chantelou from 1644 to 1648 and was acquired by Francis Egerton, 3rd Duke of Bridgewater in 1798. The paintings passed by descent to the Earls of Ellesmere, the last of whom became the Duke of Sutherland in 1964. All of the second series, which was commissioned by Chantelou, is currently on loan at the Scottish National Gallery, Edinburgh as part of the Bridgewater Loan.

References

1640 paintings
1645 paintings
Paintings by Nicolas Poussin
Collections of the National Gallery, London
Paintings in the National Galleries of Scotland
Collections of the National Gallery of Art
Religious paintings